Lion mask is a motif used from antiquity as an emblem of strength, courage, and majesty. 

The lion mask holding a ring in its mouth for a handle derives from furniture from  ancient Rome and it continues to be popular as doorknocker. Both Venetian and façon de Venise goblets feature decorative prunts moulded in the lion mask shapes alluding to the symbol of Venice, the Lion of Saint Mark.

From the early to mid-18th century, the lion mask enjoyed popularity as a favoured motif for furniture ornament, used as an arm rest support or to decorate a cabriole leg. Occasionally, a lion's paw or pelt appears alongside the mask.

External links

Masks in Europe
Lions in art
Iconography